The Seattle Hebrew Academy is a private Kindergarten–grade 8 school, located in the Capitol Hill neighborhood of Seattle.

History

The school was established in 1947 as the "Seattle Hebrew Day School" to integrate Jewish and secular studies following World War II, and in the following year, it and the Seattle Talmud Torah consolidated. The school changed its name in 1969 to "Seattle Hebrew Academy", to reflect the addition of a childhood center. The school is located in a space formerly occupied by the Sisters of the Sacred Heart and the old Forest Ridge, since 1973 when the building was purchased by the school administration.

The Academy building took extensive damage and was deemed unsafe following the Nisqually Quake in March, 2001. The school had temporary campuses during the retrofit and rebuild period. They were first housed in Mercer Island's Herzl Ner Tamid for the remainder of the 2001 school year.  The Seattle Hebrew Academy  built temporary classrooms in the parking lot of Bikur Cholim Machzikay Hadath for the lower school while the middle school was housed in portables in the upper field on the Seattle Hebrew Academy's campus. The school board raised money for renovations, totalling $8 million over the course of three years. The Academy reopened on their Capitol Hill campus in Autumn 2004.

In 2006, the Academy hired Rivy Poupko Kletenik as their head of school. She was the first woman head of school in the school's history. She served for 16 years, tied for the longest serving Head of School with the first head, Rabbi Samuel Gruadenz. 

The school is accredited through Northwest Association for Independent Schools, NWAIS.

References

External links

Seattle Hebrew Academy

1969 establishments in Washington (state)
Educational institutions established in 1969
Jewish day schools in Washington (state)
Jews and Judaism in Seattle
Middle schools in Seattle
Private elementary schools in Washington (state)
Private middle schools in Washington (state)
Landmarks in Seattle